Horodło is a village in Hrubieszów County, Lublin Voivodeship, in eastern Poland, close to the border with Ukraine. It is the seat of the gmina (administrative district) called Gmina Horodło.

The Union of Horodło was signed there in 1413. A large demonstration took place here in 1861.

During the Holocaust, the population of 1,000 Jews from the town were murdered.

The village has a current population of 1,200.

References

Villages in Hrubieszów County
Belz Voivodeship
Kholm Governorate
Lublin Voivodeship (1919–1939)